Stijn Van Opstal (born 1976) is a Flemish actor.

He graduated in 1998 from the Studio Herman Teirlinck, the same year as Tom Dewispelaere, Ben Segers and Geert Van Rampelberg, with whom he founded the theatre company Olympique Dramatique. In the theatre, he acted in Kaspar, De gebroeders Leeuwenhart, De geruchten, Adams appels and Bij het kanaal naar links.

He acted in the feature films S. and Dossier K. and played a role with his theatre companions in the television series De Parelvissers. His first television appearance was in the series Recht op Recht. He also had a recurring role as the criminal Dimitri Alva in the sixth season of the VTM television series Zone Stad. In the spring of 2013, he acted in the VIER series Met man en macht. He also played roles in several short films.

Stijn Van Opstal is in a relationship with Sarah Vangeel; they have two children together. Van Opstal grew up in Beerse.

Television and film

TV series
Windkracht 10 (1998) – Fireman
Recht op Recht (2001–02) – Stef Molenaar / Tommy Van Lebbeek
De vloek van Vlimovost (2006)
De Parelvissers (2006) – Lucas Blommaert
Zone Stad (2010–11) – Dimitri Alva
Salamander (2013) – Meneer Walters
Met man en macht (2013) – Ludo Jacobs
Safety First (2013) – Erik
Ontspoord (2013) – Bernard
Tabula Rasa (2017) – Benoit

Short films
Striker Bob (1997) – Tony
Fade out (2000) – Steve
Dialing the Devil (2001)
Blind Date (2001)
Het ruikt hier naar stront (2006) – Cliff Heylen
Nowhere Man (2008) – Man with beard
Een kleine duw (2009) – Meester Wim
Rosa, zusje van Anna (2012) – Vader

Films
S. (1998)
Dossier K.  (2009) – scientist
De premier (2016) – Driver of the Prime Minister

References

Flemish male actors
1976 births
Living people